Subekti (1914-1992) was the fourth Chief Justice of the Supreme Court of Indonesia.

Although Subekti had initially been in consideration for the position of the country's third chief justice, then-President Sukarno chose Subekti's predecessor, Suryadi, against the recommendations of the Parliament of Indonesia. Among the reasons for Sukarno's rejection was the false accusation that Subekti played poker, viewed as an immoral act unbefitting a judge. Suryadi fell into conflict with the Indonesian Judges Association (of which he'd been a founding member) as well as parliament; he resigned under President Suharto, after which parliament promptly appointed Subekti as chief justice.

Works
 The law of contracts in Indonesia: remedies of breach. Kwitang: Gunung Agung (bookstore), 1989.

References

Chief justices of the Supreme Court of Indonesia
1914 births
1992 deaths